Nelson Wesley Trout (1921–1996) was the first African-American bishop in the Evangelical Lutheran Church in America. Trout was born in Columbus, Ohio, USA.

Trout was elected bishop of the South Pacific District of the American Lutheran Church (ALC) in 1983, a position he served through 1987. At the time of his election he was a professor and director of minority studies at Trinity Lutheran Seminary, Columbus, Ohio.

Trout was renowned as a moving and powerful preacher throughout the church. During his earlier career, he served pastorates in Alabama (where he became a friend and colleague of Martin Luther King Jr.), California and Wisconsin, and as Executive Director of Lutheran Social Services, Dayton, Ohio. On two occasions he served the ALC in executive capacities: as Associate Youth Director (1962–67) and Director of Urban Evangelism (1968–70).

Trout died in 1996 at the age of 76. He is commemorated in the Calendar of Saints of the Evangelical Lutheran Church in America on September 20.

External links
www.wfn.org article
Lutheran Unit Elects Its First Black Bishop (NY Times article, June 18, 1983)

1921 births
1996 deaths
People from Columbus, Ohio
People celebrated in the Lutheran liturgical calendar
Evangelical Lutheran Church in America bishops
20th-century American clergy